Tetuani (or ; ; or Haketia) is a dialect of Judaeo-Spanish, a Jewish Romance language historically spoken by the North African Sephardim in the Algerian city of Oran. The origin of the name is believed to be the city of Tétouan, Morocco, the origin of some of the Jewish residents.

See also
 Haketia

References

Jews and Judaism in Algeria
Judaeo-Spanish
Sephardi Jewish culture in North Africa
Tétouan
Oran
City colloquials

ru:Еврейско-романские языки